Aldrich may refer to:

Places

United States
Aldrich, Alabama, unincorporated community
Aldrich, Minnesota, city
Aldrich Township, Wadena County, Minnesota
Aldrich, Missouri, village

People
Aldrich (surname), a surname (including a list of people with the surname)

People with the given name
Aldrich Ames (born 1941), American intelligence officer convicted of spying for the Soviet Union and Russia
Aldrich Robert Burgess (1918–1983), American film director

Other uses
Aldrich, subsidiary of Sigma-Aldrich#Aldrich; a life science and high technology company
Aldrich Killian, fictional Marvel Comics supervillain
Aldrich, Devourer of Gods, an antagonist in the video game Dark Souls III